Rokaya or Roka or Rokka or Rokaha surname of Magar community and Khas community .  Notable Roka/Rokaya include:

Jun Kumari Roka (Oli), Nepalese politician
Keshar Man Rokka, Nepalese politician
Manoj RC (born:Manoj Rokaya Chhetri) Nepalese

References 

Nepali-language surnames